Birgitta Sigrid Maria Sahlén (born 29 January 1953) is a Swedish professor in speech and language pathology at Lund University in Lund, Sweden. She became a professor at the university in March 2012.

Sahlén is the mother of Swedish singer Måns Zelmerlöw.

References

Swedish women academics
Speech and language pathologists
Living people
Place of birth missing (living people)
1953 births
Academic staff of Lund University